OK Prologue: Be OK is the first studio album by South Korean boy band CIX. It was released through C9 Entertainment on August 17, 2021, along with the lead single "Wave" and its music video.

Background and release
The album Ok Prologue: Be Ok marks the beginning of a new series in CIX's discography, following their previous Hello series. On July 22, 2021, pre-orders began along with the details of the album were released stating that the album will be released in three versions: Ripple, Wave, and Storm.

Track listing

Charts

Release history

References 

Korean-language albums
CIX (band) albums
2021 albums